KARY-FM (100.9 FM) is a radio station broadcasting a classic hits format. Licensed to Grandview, Washington, United States, the station serves the Yakima area. The station is currently owned by Stephens Media Group, through licensee SMG-Yakima, LLC.

History
The station went on the air as KGRU on April 22, 1987. On May 1, 1988, the station changed its call sign to the current KARY-FM.

On May 26, 2010, it was rumoured KARY's parent company New Northwest Broadcasters's stations could possibly be sold in the near future. Principal of Revitalization Partners, Alan Davis says "The stations are on the air; it’s business as usual. I can only tell you there appears to be demand for the stations." In 2012, the stations were sold to James Ingstad.

References

External links

ARY-FM
Classic hits radio stations in the United States
Radio stations established in 1987